Oenochroma is a genus of moths in the family Geometridae erected by Achille Guenée in 1857.

Species
Oenochroma alpina Turner, 1930
Oenochroma celidophora Turner, 1939
Oenochroma cerasiplaga Warren, 1914
Oenochroma cycnoptera (Lower, 1894)
Oenochroma decolorata Warren, 1896
Oenochroma infantilis Prout, 1910
Oenochroma lissoscia Turner, 1922
Oenochroma ochripennata (Walker, 1860)
Oenochroma orthodesma (Lower, 1894)
Oenochroma pallida Warren, 1898
Oenochroma phyllomorpha (Lower, 1899)
Oenochroma polyspila (Lower, 1897)
Oenochroma privata (Walker, 1860)
Oenochroma quardrigramma (Lucas, 1900)
Oenochroma subustaria (Walker, 1860)
Oenochroma turneri (Lucas, 1892)
Oenochroma vetustaria (Walker, 1860)
Oenochroma vinaria Guenée, 1857

References

Oenochrominae